Global Goal: Unite for Our Future was a virtual event held on June 27, 2020. Created by Global Citizen and the European Commission, it consisted of a summit and a concert featuring different personalities aimed to highlight the disproportionate impact of the COVID-19 pandemic on marginalized communities.

The event was produced in collaboration with companies such as Live Nation Entertainment, The Lede Company, and Roc Nation, and also by individuals such as Michele Anthony of the Universal Music Group, Declan Kelly of Teneo, Scooter Braun (with his company SB Projects), Adam Leber (on behalf of Maverick), and Derrick Johnson (on behalf of the NAACP).

Summit
The summit, titled Global Goal: Unite for Our Future—The Summit, featured panel discussions and interviews with world leaders, corporations and philanthropists as they announce new commitments to help develop equitable distribution of COVID-19 tests, treatments and vaccines, as well as rebuild communities devastated by the pandemic. It will be produced by Michael Dempsey and hosted by journalists Katie Couric, Mallika Kapur, Morgan Radford, Isha Sesay, and Keir Simmons.

Participants

Concert
The concert, titled Global Goal: Unite for Our Future—The Concert, was hosted by actor Dwayne Johnson. It was a worldwide music and entertainment special claiming to celebrate the commitments made due to the actions Global Citizens have taken.

Performers

Additional performers 

 Chloe x Halle
 Christine and the Queens
 J’Nai Bridges with Gustavo Dudamel, the Los Angeles Philharmonic and Youth Orchestra Los Angeles
 For Love Choir

Appearances

 Chris Rock
 Hugh Jackman
 Kerry Washington
 Charlize Theron
 Forest Whitaker
 David Beckham
 Salma Hayek
 Billy Porter
 Diane Kruger
 Antoni Porowski
 Ken Jeong
 Naomi Campbell
 Nikolaj Coster-Waldau
 Olivia Colman

Broadcast
The event was broadcast in the United States on NBC, MSNBC, Bloomberg Television, iHeartRadio, Sirius XM, and InsightTV.

International broadcasters

 Africa: 1Magic, BET International, Bloomberg Television, Canal+ Afrique, Comedy Central, InsightTV, MTV Africa, and MTV Base
 : Telefe
 Asia: Comedy Central, MTV, and Paramount Channel
 : MTV, Network 10, and Nine Network
 : MTV and Pickx Live
 : Multishow, Comedy Central, MTV, MTV Hits, and Paramount Channel
 : CBC, Ici Radio-Canada Télé, CTV, Citytv, Global, MTV, and InsightTV
 : Chilevisión
 : Paramount Network and VH1
 Europe: Bloomberg Television, InsightTV, and MTV
 : Paramount Network
 : CStar and MTV
 : Das Erste, InsightTV, MTV Germany, and One
 : MTV
 : Star Movies and Star World
 : MTV and MTV Israel
 : InsightTV
 : MTV and MTV Music
 : Fuji TV, MTV Japan, and Tokyo Broadcasting System Television
 Latin America: Comedy Central, MTV, MTV Hits, Paramount Channel, VH1, VH1 HD, VH1 MegaHits, Sony Channel, and TNT
 : Azteca Uno
 : MTV
 : MTV Polska
 : MTV
 : MTV
 : InsightTV
 : Mediacorp Channel 5
 : SABC 3
 : InsightTV
 : Barça TV, MTV, and RTVE
 : Paramount Network
 : MTV
 : InsightTV
 : MTV Music
 : MTV

Online streaming
The special was also available on several digital platforms worldwide such as Apple Music, Apple TV, Beats 1, Deezer, Facebook, Tidal, Twitch, Twitter, Yahoo!, and YouTube. It will also be streamed live on the Facebook pages of Brut, LADbible, and Vogue Paris.

Production 
The producers aimed for each musical performance to have a unique setting.

Impact 
The special raised $6.9 billion from 41 countries towards a COVID-19 vaccine.

References

External links

COVID-19 pandemic benefit concerts
2020 concerts
2020 television specials
June 2020 events in the United States
Music television specials
Cultural responses to the COVID-19 pandemic
Simulcasts
Television shows about the COVID-19 pandemic
Benefit concerts